Aaron Scott Walker (born March 14, 1980) is an American former college and professional football player who was a tight end in the National Football League (NFL) for five seasons during the early 2000s.  Walker played college football for the University of Florida, and thereafter he played professionally for the San Francisco 49ers and St. Louis Rams of the NFL.

Early years 

Walker was born in Titusville, Florida in 1980.  He attended Astronaut High School in Titusville, and played high school football for the Astronaut War Eagles.  As a senior tight end in 1997, Walker caught thirty-six for 497 yards, while also recording eighty-two tackles and fourteen quarterback sacks as a defensive end.  He received Florida Class 4A all-state honors and was recognized as a high school All-American by PrepStar and Super Prep.  Walker was also a letterman in basketball and baseball.

College career 

Walker accepted an athletic scholarship to attend the University of Florida in Gainesville, Florida, where he played for coach Steve Spurrier and coach Ron Zook's Florida Gators football teams from 1999 to 2002.  Walker was a second-team All-Southeastern Conference (SEC) selection after his senior season in 2002.  In his four-year college career, he played in forty-seven games, started twenty-nine of them, and caught fifty-six passes for 716 yards and nine touchdowns.

Professional career 

During his five-season NFL playing career, he appeared in fifty-five regular season games, started fourteen of them, and had twenty-five receptions for 312 yards and a touchdown.

Life after football 

As of 2013, Walker was a pit crew member for the No. 7 car of Tommy Baldwin Racing as a jackman in the NASCAR Sprint Cup Series.

See also 

 Florida Gators football, 1990–99
 List of Florida Gators in the NFL Draft
 List of St. Louis Rams players

References

Bibliography 

 Carlson, Norm, University of Florida Football Vault: The History of the Florida Gators, Whitman Publishing, LLC, Atlanta, Georgia (2007).  .
 Golenbock, Peter, Go Gators!  An Oral History of Florida's Pursuit of Gridiron Glory, Legends Publishing, LLC, St. Petersburg, Florida (2002).  .
 Hairston, Jack, Tales from the Gator Swamp: A Collection of the Greatest Gator Stories Ever Told, Sports Publishing, LLC, Champaign, Illinois (2002).  .
 McCarthy, Kevin M.,  Fightin' Gators: A History of University of Florida Football, Arcadia Publishing, Mount Pleasant, South Carolina (2000).  .

1980 births
Living people
People from Titusville, Florida
Sportspeople from the Miami metropolitan area
Players of American football from Florida
American football tight ends
Florida Gators football players
San Francisco 49ers players
St. Louis Rams players
Baltimore Ravens players
Cleveland Browns players
Baseball players from Florida
Florida Gators baseball players
Astronaut High School alumni